Diplacanthiformes (also known as Diplacanthida, Diplacanthoidei, or Diplacanthini) is an order of acanthodian fishes which lived during the Devonian Period.

Subtaxa 
 incertae sedis
 Genus Bryantonchus
 Genus Culmacanthus
 Genus Devononchus
 Genus Striacanthus
 Genus Tetanopsyrus
 Family Diplacanthidae
 Genus Diplacanthus
 Genus Milesacanthus
 Genus Ptychodictyon
 Genus Rhadinacanthus
 Family Gladiobranchidae?
 Genus Gladiobranchus
 Genus Uraniacanthus?

References 

Acanthodii
Prehistoric fish orders
Devonian fish
Devonian first appearances
Devonian extinctions